The following lists events that happened in 1959 in Libya.

Incumbents
Monarch: Idris 
Prime Minister: Abdul Majid Kubar 

 
Years of the 20th century in Libya
Libya
Libya
1950s in Libya